Abortion in Suriname is illegal except in case of the threat to life or health of the woman. The punishment for a woman who has an abortion is up to three years in prison, and the punishment for a doctor or other person who performs the procedure is up to four years.

In 2007, Health Minister :nl:Celsius Waterberg caused a stir when he criticized the legalization of euthanasia while advocating abortion in limited circumstances, namely in the case of rape or danger to the unborn child.

See also
Abortion
Abortion by country
Abortion law

References

Suriname
Suriname
Law of Suriname
Health in Suriname
Society of Suriname
Women's rights in Suriname